Association Sportive Muhanga is an association football club based in Muhanga, Rwanda. The team currently competes in the Rwanda National Football League, and plays its home games at the Muhanga Regional Stadium.

References

External links
Soccerway

Muhanga